The No. 345 Squadron RAF was a Free French ground attack fighter squadron given a Royal Air Force squadron number during World War II.

History
The squadron was formed in RAF Ayr, Scotland on 30 January 1944 from GC II/2 Free French airmen who had been based in the Middle East and was equipped with British Spitfire aircraft. It then moved to RAF stations in England including Shoreham, Fairwood Common and Biggin Hill.

For Operation Overlord (the Allied invasion of Normandy) it was equipped with the Spitfire V LF operating from RAF Shoreham as part of Air Defence of Great Britain, though under the operational control of RAF Second Tactical Air Force (2nd TAF).

With 2nd TAF it followed the allied advance from the Normandy beachheads across Europe and by November 1945 was based at Friedrichshafen, Germany. It was under RAF control until 27 November 1945 when it transferred to French control.

Aircraft operated

References

External links
 Squadron history on the official RAF website

345
Military units and formations established in 1944
Military units and formations disestablished in 1945